Propaganda Films was an American music video and film production company founded in 1986 by producers Steve Golin and Sigurjón Sighvatsson and directors David Fincher, Nigel Dick,  Dominic Sena and Greg Gold. By 1990, the company was producing almost a third of all music videos made in the U.S.

Founding and early work (1986-1990) 
As the name suggests, the production company was founded with the intent to focus on the medium of films; those that Golin and Sighvatsson couldn't get enough financing and creative control for elsewhere. However, in order to create financial stability the company focused on a base of music video production. The company also branched off into producing television commercials, which along with music videos were considered inherently lesser quality than films. Gold later commented:We were the first company that wanted to apply the principals of the commercial industry to music videos... [and] we wanted to take the aesthetics of music videos and apply them to commercials.In addition to revenue from music videos and commercials, Propaganda entered into a deal in 1988 with PolyGram which meant that the Dutch media company would pay for Propaganda's film costs in exchange for part of the film revenues. It was during this era that Propaganda made connections with the likes of David Lynch, who they hired to direct Wild at Heart. They also produced Lynch's television show Twin Peaks.

PolyGram and decline (1991-2002) 
The initial deal with PolyGram, which involved selling them 49% of Propaganda, was intended to bring about financial strength and expanded opportunities. However, Golin and the others realized they needed even more resources to continue making films.

Propaganda Films was fully acquired by PolyGram Filmed Entertainment in 1991. This brought a decrease in creative control and the budget allocations for films were tightly scrutinized by PolyGram. Nigel Dick later said:We wanted to do good work and spend a little of the budget, the markup, on a better director of photography or shooting five more rolls of film. When the PolyGram bean counters came in, we didn’t get that. ‘Where’s the markup gone?’ That’s what we got.The nineties saw Propaganda produce films of varying success, including Canadian Bacon, The Game, and Being John Malkovich.

They also continued producing popular commercials (such as the "Aaron Burr" Got Milk? commercial) and music videos for the likes of Madonna and Michael Jackson.

In 1998 PolyGram was sold to Seagram, which folded part of PolyGram into Universal and sold the commercial, music video, and management divisions of Propaganda to SCP Equity Partners. Its film division was sold to Barry Diller's USA Films, which soon ended up under the Universal/Focus Features umbrella again and eventually formally closed. By 2000 Sighvatsson had left for Lakeshore Entertainment and Golin had founded Anonymous Content. In 2000, the company had struck a deal with Mandolin Entertainment.

Notable directors who worked with Propaganda Films

 Boris Malagurski
 Vaughan Arnell
 Michael Bay
 Markus Blunder
 Paul Boyd
 Nick Brandt
 Albert Bravo
 Jhoan Camitz
 Peter Care
 John Dahl
 Nigel Dick
 David Fincher
 Antoine Fuqua
 Douglas Gayeton
 Greg Gold
 Michel Gondry
 Steve Hanft
 Spike Jonze
 David Kellogg
 Alek Keshishian
 Mark Kohr
 Christian Langlois
 John Lithgow
 David Lynch
 Pierre Winther
 Scott Marshall
 Michael Moore
 Jeffrey Obrow
 Willi Patterson
 Vadim Perelman
 Alex Proyas
 Paul Rachman
 Mark Romanek
 Stéphane Sednaoui
 Dominic Sena
 Zack Snyder
 Simon West
 Bobby Woods
 Gore Verbinski

Partial filmography
 P.I. Private Investigations (1987)
 The Blue Iguana (1988)
 Kill Me Again (1989)
 Fear, Anxiety & Depression (1989) 
 Janet Jackson's Rhythm Nation 1814 (1989)
 Industrial Symphony No. 1: The Dream of the Brokenhearted (1990)
 Twin Peaks (TV series, 1990–1991, now owned by CBS Television Distribution)
 Daddy's Dyin': Who's Got the Will? (1990)
 Wild at Heart (1990)
 The Idiot Box (TV series, 1990-1991)
 Salute Your Shorts (TV series, 1991–1992)
 Beverly Hills, 90210 (TV series, 1990–2000, now owned by CBS Television Distribution)
 Madonna: Truth or Dare (1991)
 Voices That Care (1991)
 Ruby (1992)
 A Stranger Among Us (1992)
 A Year and a Half in the Life of Metallica (1992)
 Candyman (1992)
 Fallen Angels (TV series, 1993–1995)
 Hotel Room (TV mini-series, 1993)
 Red Rock West (1993)
 Kalifornia (1993)
 Dream Lover (1993)
 Dangerous: The Short Films  (1993)
 S.F.W. (1994)
 Turbocharged Thunderbirds (TV series, 1994)
 Jason's Lyric (1994)
 Avalanche (1994)
 Dead Connection (1994)
 Coldblooded (1995)
 Canadian Bacon (1995)
 Candyman: Farewell to the Flesh (1995)
 Lord of Illusions (1995)
 Barb Wire (1996)
 The Portrait of a Lady (1996)
 Sleepers (1996)
 The Game (1997)
 A Thousand Acres (1997)
 An American Werewolf in Paris (1997)
 More Tales of the City (TV miniseries, 1998)
 Your Friends & Neighbors (1998)
 Return to Paradise (1998)
 Being John Malkovich (1999)
 The Match (1999)
 Nurse Betty (2000)
 Bounce (2000)
 The Little Vampire (2000)
 Full Frontal (2002)
 Auto Focus (2002)
 Trapped (2002)
 Adaptation. (2002)

References

External links
 Mvdbase.com: List of music videos produced by Propaganda Films

1986 establishments in California
1991 mergers and acquisitions
2002 disestablishments in California
American companies established in 1986
American companies disestablished in 2002
Companies based in Los Angeles
Defunct companies based in Greater Los Angeles
Defunct mass media companies of the United States
Entertainment companies based in California
Entertainment companies established in 1983
Entertainment companies disestablished in 2002
Film production companies of the United States
Universal Pictures